The Turner County School District is a public school district in Turner County, Georgia, United States, based in Ashburn. It serves the communities of Ashburn, Rebecca, and Sycamore.

Schools
The Turner County School District has one elementary school, one middle school, one high school, and one specialty school.

Elementary school
Turner County Elementary School

Middle school
Turner County Middle School

High school
Turner County High School

Specialty school
Turner County Specialty School

References

External links

School districts in Georgia (U.S. state)
Education in Turner County, Georgia